Our Lady of Sorrows Church, Bamford is a Roman Catholic church in the village of Bamford, Derbyshire. The church dates back to the mid-19th century and is a Grade II listed building. It was designed by M. E. Hadfield and built for Henry Fitzalan-Howard, 15th Duke of Norfolk, who had founded a similar chapel at Derwent Hall.

See also
Listed buildings in Bamford

References 

Roman Catholic churches in Derbyshire
19th-century Roman Catholic church buildings in the United Kingdom
Grade II listed churches in Derbyshire
Roman Catholic Diocese of Hallam